Rosenau Church is a church in Kaliningrad, Russia.

The Protestant church was built in Rosenau, a quarter of southern Königsberg, Germany. Land for the new church was donated by the final owners of the estate Rosenau, the Schulte-Heuthaus family. Construction began on 23 July 1914, but was halted due to the outbreak of World War I. It was finally completed from 2 April 1925 to 12 December 1926. The Neo-Gothic church included material from dismantled sections of the Königsberg fortifications. 

Lightly damaged during World War II, the building was then used for storage by the Soviet Union. Renovated from 1990 to 1992, it is now used as a place of worship by the Russian Orthodox Church.

References

1926 establishments in Germany
1945 disestablishments in Germany
20th-century Lutheran churches
Churches in Kaliningrad
Churches in Kaliningrad Oblast
Former churches in Königsberg
Gothic Revival church buildings in Russia
Christian organizations established in 1926
Church buildings converted to a different denomination
Cultural heritage monuments of regional significance in Kaliningrad Oblast